The One Hundred Twenty-fifth Ohio General Assembly was the legislative body of the state of Ohio in 2003 and 2004. In this General Assembly, both the Ohio Senate and the Ohio House of Representatives were controlled by the Republican Party.  In the Senate, there were 22 Republicans and 11 Democrats. In the House, there were 63 Republicans and 36 Democrats. It is also the first General Assembly to use redistricted legislative districts after the 2000 Census.

Major events

Vacancies
March 4, 2003: Representative Jeffrey Manning (R-57th) resigns to become Lorain County, Ohio Prosecutor.
August 31, 2003: Senator Leigh Herington (D-28th) resigns.
December 2, 2003: Representative Dean DePiero (D-15th) resigns to become Mayor of Parma, Ohio.
January 6, 2004: Senator James E. Carnes (R-20th) resigns.
January 16, 2004: Representative Greg Jolivette (R-54th) resigns to become a Commissioner in Butler County, Ohio.
March 5, 2004: Representative Bryan C. Williams (R-41) resigns to become Chair of Summit County, Ohio Board of Elections.

Appointments
January 6, 2003: Steve Stivers appointed to Senate District 16 due to the resignation of Priscilla D. Mead.
January 6, 2003: Marc Dann appointed to Senate District 32 due to the resignation of Tim Ryan.
April 8, 2003: Earl Martin appointed to House District 57 due to the resignation of Jeffrey Manning.
September 3, 2003: Kimberly Zurz appointed to Senate District 28 due to the resignation of Leigh Herington.
December 2, 2003: Timothy J. DeGeeter appointed to House District 15 due to the resignation of Dean DePiero.
January 6, 2004: Joy Padgett appointed to the 20th Senatorial District due to the resignation of James E. Carnes.
January 21, 2004: Courtney Combs appointed to House District 54 due to the resignation of Greg Jolivette.
March 5, 2004: Marilyn Slaby appointed to House District 41 due to the resignation of Bryan C. Williams.

Leadership changes
January 6, 2004: John Boccieri resigns from Assistant Minority Whip; Lance Mason appointed.

Senate

Leadership

Majority leadership
 President of the Senate: Doug White
 President pro tempore of the Senate: Jeff Jacobson
 Floor Leader: Randy Gardner
 Assistant Majority Floor Leader: Robert Spada
 Whip: Steve Austria
 Assistant Majority Whip: Jay Hottinger

Minority leadership
 Leader: Greg DiDonato
 Assistant Leader: Mark Mallory
 Whip: C.J. Prentiss
 Assistant Whip: Teresa Fedor

Members of the 125th Ohio Senate

House of Representatives

Leadership

Majority leadership
 Speaker of the House: Larry Householder
 President pro tempore of the Senate: Gary Cates
 Floor Leader: Patricia Clancy
 Assistant Majority Floor Leader: Steve Buehrer
 Majority Whip: Jim Trakas
 Assistant Majority Whip: Jon Peterson

Minority leadership
 Leader: Chris Redfern
 Assistant Leader: Joyce Beatty
 Whip: Dale Miller
 Assistant Whip: John Boccieri (January 6, 2003-January 6, 2004), Lance Mason (January 6, 2004-)

Members of the 125th Ohio House of Representatives

Appt.- Member was appointed to current House Seat

See also
Ohio House of Representatives membership, 126th General Assembly
Ohio House of Representatives membership, 125th General Assembly

References
Ohio House of Representatives official website
Project Vote Smart - State House of Ohio
Map of Ohio House Districts
Ohio District Maps 2002-2012
State Representative Official Tabulation: November 5, 2002 Ohio Secretary of State
State Senate Official Tabulation: November 5, 2002 Ohio Secretary of State

Ohio legislative sessions
2003 in Ohio
2004 in Ohio
Ohio
Ohio